Psilocybe ferrugineolateritia is a dark-spored agaric mushroom first described by the American mycologist Alexander H. Smith in an article titled "New and unusual dark-spored agarics from North America", published in the Journal of the Mitchell Society in December 1946.

References

ferrugineolaterita